The Forever Night, Never Day Tour was the first headlining concert tour by American rock band Thirty Seconds to Mars, in support of their second studio album A Beautiful Lie (2005).

Background
The tour was officially announced on January 24, 2006 through the band's official website. It was their first headlining tour; Thirty Seconds to Mars has previously served as opening act for bands like Audioslave, The Used, and My Chemical Romance. Set for March 2006, the tour showcased Thirty Seconds to Mars second studio album A Beautiful Lie, and commenced on March 7, 2006 in Tulsa, Oklahoma and ended on June 1, 2006 in Los Angeles, California. The band announced the tour shortly before releasing their single "The Kill". Thirty Seconds to Mars was forced to reschedule the first two shows of the tour due to a finger injury that bassist Matt Wachter had. In an interview with MTV News, Jared Leto described the tour as,
"It's time. After all these years on the road the fact that we still hadn't done a national headlining tour had become something that we were constantly asked about and encouraged to do. We are ready for that next step and we couldn't be more excited to finally get out there and present Thirty Seconds to Mars in the way that we see it. This is a tour that will offer a true alternative to the typical, mundane experience that seems to be readily available everywhere. We plan on presenting something very unique every single night and to create an experience that will never be forgotten. We want to welcome our family of friends, fans, and anyone and everyone to come and be a part of Forever Night, Never Day."

Opening act
 Emanuel (select dates)
 Aiden (select dates)
 Keating (select dates)
 The Red Jumpsuit Apparatus (select dates)
 Men, Women & Children (select dates)

Set list
This setlist is representative of the show in Denver at the Ogden Theatre. It does not represent all dates throughout the tour.

"A Beautiful Lie"
"Capricorn (A Brand New Name)"
"Buddha for Mary"
"Battle of One"
"The Kill"
"The Story"
"R-Evolve"
"The Mission"
"Was It a Dream?"
"From Yesterday"
Encore
 "The Fantasy"
 "Attack"

Tour dates

Festivals and other miscellaneous performances
This concert was a part of the Bamboozle Festival.

Cancellations and rescheduled shows

References

External links
Thirty Seconds to Mars official website

Thirty Seconds to Mars concert tours
2006 concert tours